Gandom Shad (also Romanized as Gandom Shād) is a village in Bakharz Rural District, in the Central District of Bakharz County, Razavi Khorasan Province, Iran. At the 2006 census, its population was 729, in 147 families.

References 

Populated places in Bakharz County